Capesterre-Belle-Eau is a commune in the French overseas region and department of Guadeloupe, in the Lesser Antilles. It is located in the south-east of Basse-Terre Island. Capesterre-Belle-Eau covers an area of 103.3 km2 (39.884 sq mi). The 1999 population was 19,568. The population density is 189 persons per km2. The inhabitants are called Capesterriens.

Etymology 

Its name comes from an expression of the navy of the 17th century: cab-be-ground, which indicates a ground exposed to the east wind. The abundance of the cascades, the rivers and the water levels led to the addition of the phrase Belle Eau, hence the name Capesterre-Belle-Eau.

History

Petroglyphs discovered in the rivers of Peru and Bananier show the presence of Native Americans.

On 4 November 1493, Christopher Columbus's second voyage unloaded there. Columbus would have met Amerindians. To commemorate this event, a bust of the navigator was raised in 1916 at the entry of Sainte-Marie.

In the 17th century, Charles Houël gave land to Dutch colonists driven out of Brazil, so that they could grow sugarcane there. After the abolition of chattel slavery in 1848, Indian indentured workers were hired to replace the plantation slaves. They built a temple in the Shangy district.

Near the Bois Debout estate, on a small way leading to an underwood, a flagstone in the Cemetery of the Slaves, requires the visitors to "Honor and Respect" the memory of the slaves. Several tens of unnamed tombs oriented "head towards Africa" are there.

Geography

The town is located at the south-east of the Basse-Terre and is located south of the Capesterre River.

Carbet Falls comprises three cascades.

Climate
Capesterre-Belle-Eau experiences rainfall throughout the year, with a wetter season between July and November that coincides with hurricane season. The city receives 2000–2500 mm of rainfall. Tropical heat brings constant highs of around 32 °C (89 °F) that drop to 20 °C (68 °F) at night.

Trade winds, called alizés, blow from the northeast and often temper the climate.

Economy

The economy is geared towards agriculture, particularly bananas, thanks to the quality of the soil. Farmers cultivate sugar cane, cocoa, vanilla, coffee, pineapples and vegetables of all kinds.

A rum distillery operates there.

Population

Education
Public preschools include:
 Ecole maternelle Cayenne
 Ecole maternelle Fonds Cacao
 Ecole maternelle Ilet Pérou
 Ecole maternelle Saint Sauveur
 Ecole maternelle Sainte Marie
 Ecole maternelle Sarlasonne

Public primary and elementary schools include:
 Ecole primaire Beuve Anatole
 Ecole primaire Bananier
 Ecole primaire Belair
 Ecole primaire Cambrefort
 Ecole primaire Amédée Fengarol
 Ecole primaire Ilet Pérou
 Ecole primaire Joliot-Curie Frédéric
 Ecole primaire L'Habituée
 Ecole primaire Minatchy Léonce
 Ecole primaire Sainte Marie
 Ecole élémentaire Alexius de lacroix

Preschool/primary school groups include:
 Groupe scolaire Arsene Monrose

Public junior high schools include:
 Collège Germain Saint-Ruf
 Collège Sylviane Telchid

Public senior high schools include:
 LDM de l'automobile Paul Lacave

Personalities
Amédée Fengarol (1905-1951), Guadeloupean politician
Sonny Rupaire, poet
Henry Sidambarom (1863–1952), a Justice of the Peace and defender of the cause of Indian workers in Guadeloupe
Sylviane Telchid, writer and professor

See also
Communes of the Guadeloupe department
Basse-Terre Island

References

External links
Official website 

Communes of Guadeloupe